Buon may refer to:

 Buon Tan (born 1967), French politician
 Tony Buon (born 1960), British workplace psychologist, speaker, mediator and author

See also